Samuel Morris (November 21, 1711 – April 1782) was a merchant and Patriot in colonial and revolutionary-era Philadelphia, Pennsylvania.

Born in Philadelphia, the son of Anthony Morris, he took an active part in the affairs of the province. In 1756 he was commissioned by Governor Robert Hunter Morris an auditor to settle the accounts of the ill-fated Braddock expedition. He was a zealous advocate of independence, and during the American Revolution was a member of the committee of safety and the board of war. In 1777 he was appointed register of wills of Philadelphia, which office he held until 1782. From 1779 till his death he was a trustee of the University of Pennsylvania.

He died in Philadelphia in April 1782.

Family
Samuel Morris married Hannah Cadwalader. Their sons James and Samuel Cadwalader attended the Academy of Philadelphia in its earliest years. Samuel Cadwalader Morris became a member of the College (later the University of Pennsylvania), class of 1760.

External links
Biography and portrait at the University of Pennsylvania

1711 births
1782 deaths
People of Pennsylvania in the American Revolution